Marco Belladonna (18 July 1916 – 10 October 2003), also known as Fernando Belladonna, was an Italian football player.

He played one game in the Serie A in the 1933/34 season for A.S. Roma.

External links
Profile at Enciclopediadelcalcio.it
 Career summary by playerhistory.com

1916 births
Italian footballers
Serie A players
2003 deaths
A.S. Roma players
Cosenza Calcio 1914 players
Association football forwards